Fairweather or Fair Weather may refer to:.

People
 Fairweather (surname)

Music
 Fairweather (band), an American indie rock band
 Fair Weather (band), a British pop group from 1970 to 1971
 Fair Weather (album), a 2000 album by Alison Brown
 "Fair Weather", a track on the 2018 album The Light Is Leaving Us All by Current 93

Geography
 Fairweather Glacier, Glacier Bay National Park, Alaska, United States
 Fairweather Range, unofficial name of a mountain range in Alaska and British Columbia, Canada
 Mount Fairweather, on the border between Alaska and British Columbia
 Mount Fairweather (Antarctica)
 Cape Fairweather, on the coast of Graham Land, British Antarctic Territory

Ships
 MV Fairweather, a fast ferry for the Alaska Marine Highway System
 NOAAS Fairweather (S 220), formerly USC&GS Fairweather, a research ship in service in the United States Coast and Geodetic Survey from 1968 to 1970 and in the United States National Oceanic and Atmospheric Administration from 1970 to 1989 and since 2004

Other uses
 Fairweather, a women's fashion chain formerly owned by Dylex
 Fair Weather, a 2002 compilation of comics by Joe Matt